Gunthoti Venkata Subbaiah was an Indian politician from YSR Congress Party. He was elected as a member of the Andhra Pradesh Legislative Assembly from Badvel. On March 28, 2021, Venkata Subbaiah died in a private hospital at Kadapa after suffering from protracted illness for a long time.

References 

1950s births
2021 deaths
Year of birth missing
21st-century Indian politicians
People from Darbhanga district
YSR Congress Party politicians
Andhra Pradesh MLAs 2019–2024